University of Tuzla (Bosnian: Univerzitet u Tuzli) is a public university located in Tuzla, Bosnia and Herzegovina. The university was founded in 1958. It became a proper university in 1976, and today is one of the major institutions of higher learning in Bosnia and Herzegovina.

In the academic year of 2014–2015, the total number of enrolled students in all faculties and academies was 10,683. The total number of enrolled students has shown a steady decline from the academic year 2010–2011, when 14,212 students were enrolled at the university.

History
A college of mining was established in 1958 and Faculty of Chemical Engineering in 1959 as the first faculty outside University of Sarajevo; the college then had 159 students. The Mining School developed into a Faculty of Mining in 1960. From there, more faculties were added and enrollment increased until an independent university of higher education was created in 1976. 1970's was a decade of exponential rise in number of higher education institutions in the former Yugoslavia when alongside Tuzla universities in Osijek, Rijeka, Split, Mostar, Podgorica, Bitola, Maribor, Banja Luka and Kragujevac all opened their doors.

Sport
In the 2000s, the Basketball club UKK Student, which competes in A1 League (2nd Tier on Pyramid), was established at the university.

Faculties and Academies

Academy of Performing Arts
Faculty of Law
Faculty of Education and Rehabilitation
Faculty of Economics
Faculty of Electrical Engineering
Faculty of Mechanical Engineering
Faculty of Chemical Engineering and Biotechnology
Faculty of Mining, Geology and Civil Engineering
Faculty of Medicine (six year study)
Faculty of Natural Sciences and Mathematics
Faculty of Philosophy
Faculty of Pharmacy
Faculty of Physical Education and Sport

Research and publications 
The university publishes textbooks, research books, and several peer reviewed journals. Since 2016, the Faculty of Philosophy publishes the journal Social Sciences and Humanities Studies (Društvene i humanističke studije DHS). Professor Vedad Spahić serves as the Editor-in-Chief.

See also
 Balkan Universities Network
 List of universities in Bosnia and Herzegovina
 Education in Bosnia and Herzegovina

References

Universities in Tuzla
Buildings and structures in Tuzla
Universities in Bosnia and Herzegovina
Educational institutions established in 1949
1949 establishments in Yugoslavia
Tuzla